José Carlos Aponte Dalmau (born March 2, 1965) is a Puerto Rican politician and current mayor of Carolina, Puerto Rico.

Aponte is the son of longtime mayor of Carolina, José Aponte de la Torre and Carmen Idalia "Daly" Dalmau. He completed his fourth year of high school at Luz América Calderon in Carolina, and subsequently studied secondary education in Civil Engineering at the Polytechnic University of Puerto Rico. When his father died on May 5, 2007, José Carlos announced his availability to continue his father's work. He was sworn on May 10, 2007. He was officially elected at the 2008 general elections. As mayor, he was appointed to the EPA's Local Government Advisory Committee (LGAC) and Small Community Advisory Subcommittee.

References

External links
José Carlos Aponte Dalmau Profile on WAPA-TV

1965 births
American civil engineers
Mayors of Carolina, Puerto Rico
Popular Democratic Party (Puerto Rico) politicians
Living people